Chiping District is a district of northwestern Shandong province, People's Republic of China.

Administrative divisions
As 2012, this District is divided to 2 subdistricts, 6 towns and 8 townships.
Subdistricts
Zhenxing Subdistrict
Xinfa Subdistrict

Towns

Townships

Climate

References

Chiping
Liaocheng